The World Blitz Chess Championship 2022 was the 2022 edition of the annual chess tournament held by FIDE to determine the world champion in chess played under blitz time controls. Since 2012, FIDE has held the World Rapid and Blitz Championships at a joint tournament. The tournament was held in Almaty, Kazakhstan from 29–30 December 2022, using a Swiss-system with 21 rounds for the open tournament and 17 rounds for the women's tournament. Players eligible to participate were to either be rated at least 2550 Elo (2250 Elo for women) in a FIDE rating list during 2022, or be a reigning national champion. Time controls for the tournament were 3+2, meaning each player initially starts with 3 minutes and gains 2 additional seconds following each move.

Participants 
176 players took part in the open tournament, and 99 in the women's tournament.

Prize fund 
The prize fund for both the open and women's tournament is shown below. In case of a tie (except for first place) all prize money is shared between the players. Players outside the brackets do not receive any prize money. All amounts are in United States dollars.

Open tournament:

Total: $350,000

Women's tournament:

Total: $150,000

Schedule 
The opening ceremony took place on Sunday 25 December. Start times are approximate as all matches in the previous round must finish before the next round can commence. All times are EKT.

Tiebreak regulations 

For players who finish on the same score, final position was determined by the following tie-breaks, in order:

 Buchholz Cut 1 (the sum of the scores of each of the opponents of a player but reduced by the lowest score of the opponents)
 Buchholz (the sum of the scores of each of the opponents of a player)
 Average Rating of Opponents Cut 1 (average rating of opponents excluding the lowest rated opponent)
 The results of individual games between tied players
 Drawing of lots

If two or more players were tied for any position other than first, the above mentioned tiebreak system decided the ranking of the tied players.

If two or more players were tied for first, the top two players who finished the highest on the above mentioned tiebreaks would have played a two game mini match with the time  control of 3+2 (with colours of the first game drawn) to decide the winner. If the score is tied 1-1, the players continue to play single 3+2 games until one of the players has won one game (the player who finished highest on the above mentioned tiebreaks shall have the white pieces for the first game and the colours will alternate from the next game).

Open tournament results 
The following table lists all participants, with the results from the 21 rounds. They are ranked according to the results, taking into account the tie-breaks.

Notation: "1 (B 102)" indicates a win (1 point) with black pieces (B) against player of rank 102 (Vladislav Kovalev).

Women's tournament results 
The following table lists all participants, with the results from the 17 rounds. They are ranked according to the results, taking into account the tie-breaks.

Notation: "1 (B 57)" indicates a win (1 point) with black pieces (B) against player of rank 57 (Xeniya Balabayeva). The first tiebreak (labeled BC1) is the Buchholz Cut 1 score, the second tiebreak (labeled BS) is the Buchholz score, and the third tiebreak (labelled AROC1) is the average rating of opponents cut 1.

Notes

References 

World Blitz Chess Championship
2022 in chess
2022 in Kazakhstani sport
December 2022 sports events in Asia
Sports competitions in Almaty
Chess in Kazakhstan